The Men's Greco-Roman 48 kg at the 1972 Summer Olympics as part of the wrestling program at the Fairgrounds, Judo and Wrestling Hall.

Medalists

Tournament results 
The competition used a form of negative points tournament, with negative points given for any result short of a fall. Accumulation of 6 negative points eliminated the wrestler. When only two or three wrestlers remain, a special final round is used to determine the order of the medals.

Legend
DNA — Did not appear
TPP — Total penalty points
MPP — Match penalty points

Penalties
0 — Won by Fall, Passivity, Injury and Forfeit
0.5 — Won by Technical Superiority
1 — Won by Points
2 — Draw
2.5 — Draw, Passivity
3 — Lost by Points
3.5 — Lost by Technical Superiority
4 — Lost by Fall, Passivity, Injury and Forfeit

Round 1

Round 2

Round 3

Round 4

Round 5

Final 

Results from the preliminary round are carried forward into the final (shown in yellow).

Final standings

References

External links
Official Report

Greco-Roman 48kg